For the 1950–51 season, Carlisle United F.C. competed in Football League Third Division North.

Results & fixtures

Football League Third Division North

FA Cup

References

 11v11

External links

Carlisle United F.C. seasons